Deng Enxi (born 18 April 2005) is a Chinese actress.

Career
In 2017, Deng made her acting debut in the suspense thriller film The Devotion of Suspect X, based on the novel of the same name by Keigo Higashino. The same year, she played her first leading role in the drama film Summer is the Coldest Season.

In 2018, Deng starred in the comedy drama film A Cool Fish, receiving positive reviews for her performance as a rebellious girl. She also starred in the romance film Last Letter, portraying two different characters. The same year, she was cast in the fantasy adventure drama Legend of Awakening. 

In 2019, Deng starred in the youth sports drama Never Stand Still: Skate Our Souls as a skateboarding player.

In 2020, Deng starred in the detective comedy drama Detective Chinatown, and fantasy wuxia drama Legend of Awakening.

Filmography

Film

Television series

Awards and nominations

References

2005 births
21st-century Chinese actresses
Living people
Chinese television actresses
Chinese film actresses
Actresses from Chongqing
Chinese child actresses